Algebraic signal processing (ASP) is an emerging area of theoretical signal processing (SP). In the algebraic theory of signal processing, a set of filters is treated as an (abstract) algebra, a set of signals is treated as a module or vector space, and convolution is treated as an algebra representation. The advantage of algebraic signal processing is its generality and portability.

History 

Definitions 
Suppose  is a vector space representing a set signals. A representation of  consists of an algebra homomorphism  where  is the algebra of linear transformations  with composition (equivalent, in the finite-dimensional case, to matrix multiplication). For convenience, we write  for the endomorphism . To be an algebra homomorphism,  must not only be a linear transformation, but also satisfy the propertyGiven a signal , convolution of the signal by a filter  yields a new signal . Some additional terminology is needed from the representation theory of algebras. The image of a generator  is called a shift operator. In all practically all examples, convolutions are formed as polynomials in  generated by shift operators. However, this is not necessary the caser for a representation of an arbitrary algebra.

Examples

Discrete Signal Processing 
In discrete signal processing (DSP), the signal space is the set of complex-valued functions  with bounded energy (i.e. square-integrable functions). This means the infinite series  where  is the modulus of a complex number. The shift operator is given by the linear endomorphism . The filter space is the algebra of polynomials with complex coefficients  and convolution is given by   where  is an element of the algebra.

Graph Signal Processing 
A weighted graph is an undirected graph  with pseudometric on the node set  written . A graph signal is simply a real-valued function on the set of nodes of the graph. In graph neural networks, graph signals are sometimes called features. The filter algebra is the algebra of polynomials in one indeterminate . There a few possible choices for a graph shift operator (GSO). The choice is dependent on performance and design considerations.

Other Examples 
Other mathematical objects with their own proposed signal-processing frameworks are algebraic signal models. These objects include including quivers, graphons, semilattices, finite groups, and Lie groups, and others.

Intertwining Maps 
In the framework of representation theory, relationships between two representations of the same algebra are described with intertwining maps which in the context of signal processing translates to transformations of signals that respect the algebra structure. An intertwining map is a linear transformation  such that

The z transform is a  prototypical example of an intertwining map.

Algebraic Neural Networks 
Inspired by a recent perspective that popular graph neural networks (GNNs) architectures are in fact convolutional neural networks (CNNs), recent work has been focused on developing novel neural network architectures from the algebraic point-of-view. An algebraic neural network is a composition of algebraic convolutions, possibly with multiple features and feature aggregations, and nonlinearities.

References

External links
Smart Project: Algebraic Theory of Signal Processing at the Department of Electrical and Computer Engineering at Carnegie Mellon University.
Lecture 12: "Algebraic Neural Networks," University of Pennsylvania (ESE 514).

Algebra
Signal processing